A music teacher is a type of educator who instructs students in music.

Music Teacher may also refer to:

"The Music Teacher" (short story), a 1959 short story by John Cheever
The Music Teacher (film), 1988 Belgian film
Music Teacher (film), a 2019 Indian film

See also
Music (disambiguation)
Teacher (disambiguation)